The order-6 dodecahedral honeycomb is one of 11 paracompact regular honeycombs in hyperbolic 3-space. It is paracompact because it has vertex figures composed of an infinite number of faces, with all vertices as ideal points at infinity. It has Schläfli symbol {5,3,6}, with six ideal dodecahedral cells surrounding each edge of the honeycomb. Each vertex is ideal, and surrounded by infinitely many dodecahedra. The honeycomb has a triangular tiling vertex figure.

Symmetry

Images 

The order-6 dodecahedral honeycomb is similar to the 2D hyperbolic infinite-order pentagonal tiling, {5,∞}, with pentagonal faces, and with vertices on the ideal surface.

Related polytopes and honeycombs 
The order-6 dodecahedral honeycomb is a regular hyperbolic honeycomb in 3-space, and one of 11 which are paracompact.

There are 15 uniform honeycombs in the [5,3,6] Coxeter group family, including this regular form, and its regular dual, the order-5 hexagonal tiling honeycomb.

The order-6 dodecahedral honeycomb is part of a sequence of regular polychora and honeycombs with triangular tiling vertex figures:

It is also part of a sequence of regular polytopes and honeycombs with dodecahedral cells:

Rectified order-6 dodecahedral honeycomb 

The rectified order-6 dodecahedral honeycomb, t1{5,3,6} has icosidodecahedron and triangular tiling cells connected in a hexagonal prism vertex figure.
 Perspective projection view within Poincaré disk model

It is similar to the 2D hyperbolic pentaapeirogonal tiling, r{5,∞} with pentagon and apeirogonal faces.

Truncated order-6 dodecahedral honeycomb 

The truncated order-6 dodecahedral honeycomb, t0,1{5,3,6} has truncated dodecahedron and triangular tiling cells connected in a hexagonal pyramid vertex figure.

Bitruncated order-6 dodecahedral honeycomb 

The bitruncated order-6 dodecahedral honeycomb is the same as the bitruncated order-5 hexagonal tiling honeycomb.

Cantellated order-6 dodecahedral honeycomb 

The cantellated order-6 dodecahedral honeycomb, t0,2{5,3,6}, has rhombicosidodecahedron, trihexagonal tiling, and hexagonal prism cells, with a wedge vertex figure.

Cantitruncated order-6 dodecahedral honeycomb 

The cantitruncated order-6 dodecahedral honeycomb, t0,1,2{5,3,6} has truncated icosidodecahedron, hexagonal tiling, and hexagonal prism facets, with a mirrored sphenoid vertex figure.

Runcinated order-6 dodecahedral honeycomb 

The runcinated order-6 dodecahedral honeycomb is the same as the runcinated order-5 hexagonal tiling honeycomb.

Runcitruncated order-6 dodecahedral honeycomb 

The runcitruncated order-6 dodecahedral honeycomb, t0,1,3{5,3,6} has truncated dodecahedron, rhombitrihexagonal tiling, decagonal prism, and hexagonal prism facets, with an isosceles-trapezoidal pyramid vertex figure.

Runcicantellated order-6 dodecahedral honeycomb 

The runcicantellated order-6 dodecahedral honeycomb is the same as the runcitruncated order-5 hexagonal tiling honeycomb.

Omnitruncated order-6 dodecahedral honeycomb 

The omnitruncated order-6 dodecahedral honeycomb is the same as the omnitruncated order-5 hexagonal tiling honeycomb.

See also 
 Convex uniform honeycombs in hyperbolic space
 Regular tessellations of hyperbolic 3-space
 Paracompact uniform honeycombs

References 
Coxeter, Regular Polytopes, 3rd. ed., Dover Publications, 1973. . (Tables I and II: Regular polytopes and honeycombs, pp. 294–296)
 The Beauty of Geometry: Twelve Essays (1999), Dover Publications,  (Chapter 10, Regular Honeycombs in Hyperbolic Space) Table III
 Jeffrey R. Weeks The Shape of Space, 2nd edition  (Chapter 16-17: Geometries on Three-manifolds I,II)
 Norman Johnson Uniform Polytopes, Manuscript
 N.W. Johnson: The Theory of Uniform Polytopes and Honeycombs, Ph.D. Dissertation, University of Toronto, 1966 
 N.W. Johnson: Geometries and Transformations, (2018) Chapter 13: Hyperbolic Coxeter groups

Honeycombs (geometry)